Down There is the debut solo album by Animal Collective member Avey Tare (David Portner), released worldwide on October 25, 2010, on Paw Tracks. The album was recorded in June with Animal Collective bandmate Josh Dibb (credited as Conrad Deaken) at the Good House, an old church in upstate New York. "Lucky 1" was officially released for download as the first single on October 5, 2010.

Musical style

Down There is a darker album compared to other contributions that Portner has made. The entire album has a "watery" feel to it, almost as if the music is being played in a swamp. Flowing water, animal sounds, and clips of distorted human conversations can be heard within the majority of the songs on this album.

The two tracks "Heather in the Hospital" and "Lucky 1", which appear towards the end of the record, were once envisioned as one song grouped together. Portner then decided to split the tracks into two separate pieces after recording, earning their separate titles.

Track listing

References

2010 albums
Avey Tare albums